Estadio Francisco Vasques is a multi-use stadium located in Belém, Brazil. It is used mostly for football matches and hosts the home matches of Tuna Luso Brasileira and of the Clube Municipal Ananindeua. The stadium has a maximum capacity of 5,000 people.

Francisco Vasques
Buildings and structures in Belém
Sports venues in Pará